Ascot Vale railway station is located on the Craigieburn line in Victoria, Australia. It serves the northern Melbourne suburb of Ascot Vale, and it opened on 1 November 1860.

History

Ascot Vale station opened on 1 November 1860, just over a week after the railway line to Essendon opened as part of the private Melbourne and Essendon Railway Company. The station closed with the line on 1 July 1864, but was reopened on 9 October 1871, under government ownership. Like the suburb itself, the station was named after Ascot Racecourse in England, given its proximity to Flemington Racecourse.

In 1882, a temporary station building was provided, after duplication of the line, with the present building on Platform 1 dating from 1889. A signal box was provided in the same year, but was closed with the abolition of mechanical signalling in 1918.

Platforms and services

Ascot Vale has two side platforms. It is serviced by Metro Trains' Craigieburn line services.

Platform 1:
  all stations services to Flinders Street

Platform 2:
  all stations services to Craigieburn

Transport links

Transit Systems Victoria operates two routes via Ascot Vale station, under contract to Public Transport Victoria:
 : Footscray station – Moonee Ponds Junction
 : Williamstown – Moonee Ponds Junction

Yarra Trams operates one route via Ascot Vale station:
 : Moonee Ponds Junction – Footscray station

References

External links

 Melway map at street-directory.com.au

Railway stations in Melbourne
Railway stations in Australia opened in 1860
Transport in the City of Moonee Valley